Edward Aylmer Digby KC (3 October 1883 – 14 November 1935) was a British Naval Officer, Kings Council and politician.

His father was Sir Kenelm Edward Digby

A gunnery specialist plagued by terrible eyesight and "neurasthenia", Digby served in the Royal Navy until 1919 when he was finally invalided and placed on the retired list for his infirmities at the rank of Commander. Although he stood as a Liberal parliamentary candidate at the 1918 general election, he later joined the Labour Party and stood as a Labour parliamentary candidate in 1931.

Electoral record

References

1883 births
1935 deaths
Labour Party (UK) parliamentary candidates
Liberal Party (UK) parliamentary candidates